John Cherry may refer to:

Politics
 John Cherry (Australian politician) (born 1965), former Australian Democrats Senator
 John D. Cherry (born 1951), Lieutenant Governor of Michigan
 John Cherry III (politician), member of the Michigan House of Representatives

Others
 John Cherry (rower) (1914–1943), English rower
 John A. Cherry (born 1942), Canadian professor of hydrogeology
 John F. Cherry, Aegean prehistorian and survey archaeologist
 John R. Cherry III (1948–2022), American film director